The 1998–99 First League of the Republika Srpska is the 4th season since establishment. Since Football Association of Republika Srpska is not a member of UEFA nor FIFA, league champion did not qualify for European tournament. Croats and Bosniaks had their own league and their champion did not qualify to European tournament either.

Teams

League table

See also
1998–99 First League of Bosnia and Herzegovina

External links
 RSSSF (Table Different with bihsoccer.com)
 FSRS Official website

Srpska
1998–99 in Bosnia and Herzegovina football
First League of the Republika Srpska seasons